shahbazbag (also Romanized as Cheshmeh Kabūd; also known as Sarcheshmeh-ye Kabūd) is a village in Mirbag-e Shomali Rural District, in the Central District of Delfan County, Lorestan Province, Iran. At the 2006 census, its population was 98, in 21 families.

References 

Towns and villages in Delfan County